Erich Akt (3 July 1898 in Krotoschin – Unknown) was a German politician in the Nazi party during and before the years of World War II. From 1938 to 1945 he was a member of the Reichstag.

Life

After attending elementary school and secondary school, in 1914, Erich Akt participated in the First World War.  Erich Akt served on both the eastern and western fronts and was wounded twice. In addition, he was awarded the Iron Cross awarded both classes. After the war, Erich Akt earned his living as a labourer at the District Office Königsberg and as a banker in Berlin.

On 1 November 1929, Erich Akt became member of the NSDAP (membership number 160354). In 1933, the Town Council and voluntary act of the city council member in Berlin's Friedrichshain field. In 1934, he was appointed Gauausbildungsleiter, in 1935 and 1936 for salaried City Council Regional Inspector III of the district administration of Greater Berlin.

From April 1938 to the end of the Nazi regime in 1945, Akt  was an MP for the constituency of 3 (Berlin East) in the Reichstag. In the SA, Akt was appointed Oberführer on 20 April 1944. His whereabouts after April 1945 are unknown.

References
 Joachim Lilla (Bearbeiter): Statisten in Uniform. Die Mitglieder des Reichstags 1933-1945. Düsseldorf 2004, .
 Erich Stockhorst: 5000 Köpfe - Wer war was im Dritten Reich. Kiel 2000, .

External links
Entry on Datenbank der deutschen Parlamentsabgeordneten

Sturmabteilung personnel
Members of the Reichstag of Nazi Germany
1898 births
Year of death missing
Nazi Party politicians
Recipients of the Iron Cross (1914), 2nd class
Recipients of the Iron Cross (1914), 1st class
Sturmabteilung officers
German Army personnel of World War I